The WDX Institute is a not-for-profit research body established to further academic research on World Currency Baskets. 
It is responsible for independently monitoring the Algorithm of the Wocu, a standardized basket of currencies comprising the national currencies of the 20 largest national economies measured by GDP.

See also
Wocu
Special drawing rights
Bancor
European Currency Unit
World currency unit
World currency

References

 Coats, Warren (1989) "In Search of a Monetary Anchor : A 'New' Monetary Standard," IMF Working Paper No. 89/82.
 Staff of the International Monetary Fund (2009) "World Economic Outlook, October 2009: Sustaining the Recovery", October 15, 2009
 Kang, Shi, Juanyi Xu (2008) "The Optimal Currency Basket with Input Currency  and Output Currency," HKIMR Working Paper No. 17/2008

External links 
WDX Institute
Wocu

International economic organizations
Research institutes in London